WebNFS is an extension to the Network File System (NFS) for allowing clients to access a file system over the internet using a simplified, firewall-friendly protocol.

WebNFS was developed to give Java applets and other internet enabled applications a way of accessing filesystem services over the internet. While NFS provides applications on Unix with full filesystem semantics, not all of these might be needed in a distributed, read-only web environment. Conversely, access restrictions—such as requiring the use of restricted ports for originating requests—normally used in closed environments are not usually applicable in public distributed environments.

WebNFS makes use of a well known port (port 2049 on both UDP and TCP) thus avoiding the overhead and unpredictability of using the ONC RPC portmap protocol. WebNFS adds public filehandles and multicomponent lookups to the NFS protocol.

WebNFS is specified by a number of RFCs:
 : WebNFS Client
 : WebNFS Server
 : NFS URL Scheme
 : Security negotiation for WebNFS

In 2007, Sun Microsystems opensourced its WebNFS implementation. The name has since changed to YANFS (Yet Another NFS) to reflect the expanded scope of the project to include a server side implementation.

Legacy
While WebNFS itself did not gain much traction, several important WebNFS features later became part of NFSv4 – such as the usage of port 2049, or the concept of a fixed "root filehandle" (which evolved from WebNFS public filehandles and allows exported filesystems to be accessed without needing the MOUNT protocol to learn their individual root handles first), both together allowing NFSv4 to function without the portmap service.

References

External links
 YANFS website

Internet protocols
Network file systems
Internet Protocol based network software
Unix file system-related software
Application layer protocols